Miles Aubrey Bellville (28 April 1909 – 27 October 1980) was a British sailor who competed in the 1936 Summer Olympics.

In 1936 he was a crew member of the British boat Lalage which won the gold medal in the six metre class.

External links
profile

1909 births
1980 deaths
British male sailors (sport)
Olympic sailors of Great Britain
Sailors at the 1936 Summer Olympics – 6 Metre
Olympic gold medallists for Great Britain
English Olympic medallists
Olympic medalists in sailing
Medalists at the 1936 Summer Olympics